Tawny is an extended play released by American post-hardcore band, Drug Church. The band's fifth overall EP, it was released on June 25, 2021 through Pure Noise Records.

The EP, featuring the band's 2020 single, "Bliss Out" was intended by the band to be a holdover release between the release of their third studio album, Cheer, which came out in 2018, and at the time, their forthcoming fourth studio album, Hygiene, which was released the following year.

Background and promotion 
The songs for the EP were written and recorded throughout 2019 and 2020, with the first single, "Bliss Out", being recorded in summer 2019. In summer 2020, the rest of the album was recorded.

Two of the four tracks on the EP were released as singles. The first single, "Bliss Out" was released on January 21, 2020. The self-titled single, "Tawny" (stylized in all-caps), was released on April 22, 2021. With the release of the self-titled single, the EP itself was announced.

Track listing

Critical reception 

Mischa Pearlman of Kerrang! gave the EP a four out of five-star review. In her review, Pearlman said that Tawny "is beautifully brutal – or maybe brutally beautiful – and serves, like the rest of this EP, as both a perfect antidote to, and reflection of, the troubled times in which we live." Danny Lowlife, writing for Invict magazine gave the EP an 8 out of 10, saying that Tawny is an EP "that could not be released at a better time. It is comprehensively done, there is nothing within this that lacks character or presents itself in a way which is the identity of another band. You listen to it and you know who is playing, who is singing. It is a wonderful EP that will have first time listeners ready for a larger album." In a slightly more mixed review, Paul Greenan, of Boolin Tunes gave the album a 7.5 out of 10, emphasizing the album as a good listen for existing fans of the band. Greenan did emphasize that the EP is "not a detour from what you’d expect, at risk of maybe sounding a little samey at points, but it’s a nice appetiser before their next release, which I can only assume will be a new LP. In the meantime, enjoy this bite-sized portion of post-hardcore snark".

Personnel 
 Drug Church
 Nick Cogan - electric guitar
 Cory Galusha - electric guitar
 Patrick Kindlon - vocals
 Chris Villeneuve - drums
 Patrick Wynne - bass
Additional personnel
Alex Salter - assistant engineering, tambourine
Jon Markson - producing, engineering, mixing, additional vocals
Skylar Sarkis - additional vocals

References

External links 
 
 Tawny at Bandcamp

2021 EPs
Drug Church EPs
Pure Noise Records EPs